Pick and Choose is a Canadian short film television series which aired on CBC Television in 1971.

Premise
Alex Trebek hosted this selection of short films produced at CBC stations throughout Canada. Episodes would be given a theme such as artists, history or women, around which the films were grouped.

Scheduling
This half-hour series was broadcast Sundays at 2:00 p.m. (Eastern) from 4 July to 12 September 1971.

References

External links
 
 

CBC Television original programming
1971 Canadian television series debuts
1971 Canadian television series endings